U-24 is an intergovernment organization proposed by President of Ukraine Volodymyr Zelenskyy with the ability to immediately stop any conflicts between countries. It was first voiced by President Volodymyr Zelenskyy at his impassioned speech to the U.S. Congress on 16 March 2022.

Overview 
On 16 March 2022, Volodymyr Zelenskyy, President of Ukraine, gave a speech to the U.S. Congress via video conference. Zelenskyy thanked the American people for the support they were providing to Ukraine in context of the 2022 Russian invasion of Ukraine; asked for more diplomatic and military help; and initiated the creation of the intergovernment body or association called U-24. U-24 would stand for United for Peace, while 24 means both 24 hours (1 day) and the 24th of February, the date of Russian invasion of Ukraine.

The idea is that the U-24 should provide all necessary assistance, including armed assistance, within a 24 hour response window.

In addition, such an association "could provide assistance to those who are experiencing natural disasters, man-made disasters, who have become victims of a humanitarian crisis or an epidemic."

References 

2022 Russian invasion of Ukraine
Volodymyr Zelenskyy
Foreign relations of Ukraine
2022 in international relations
Intergovernmental organizations